Wu Yanjian  is a paralympic athlete from China competing mainly in category T46 distance running events.

He competed in two paralympics, firstly in 1996 where as well as competing in the 800m and as part of the Chinese 4 × 100 m relay he won silver in both the 1500m and 5000m.  He returned for the 2000 Summer Paralympics where he competed in the Marathon and again won the same medal in the 1500m and 5000m but unfortunately it was only the bronze.

References

External links
 

Year of birth missing (living people)
Living people
Chinese male middle-distance runners
Chinese male long-distance runners
Paralympic athletes of China
Paralympic silver medalists for China
Paralympic bronze medalists for China
Paralympic medalists in athletics (track and field)
Athletes (track and field) at the 1996 Summer Paralympics
Athletes (track and field) at the 2000 Summer Paralympics
Medalists at the 1996 Summer Paralympics
Medalists at the 2000 Summer Paralympics
20th-century Chinese people